Douglas A. Blackmon (born 1964) is an American writer and journalist who won a Pulitzer Prize in 2009 for his book, Slavery by Another Name: The Re-Enslavement of Black Americans from the Civil War to World War II.

Early life and education
Blackmon was born in Stuttgart, Arkansas, and grew up in Leland, Mississippi, in the Mississippi Delta. He has said that the small town of 6,000 was evenly split between blacks and whites; the county and area, one of plantations, was majority black. It was the site of a plantation strike among black laborers, leading to extensive civil rights activity in the mid-twentieth century. He graduated from Hendrix College.

Career

Blackmon first worked as a reporter for the Arkansas Democrat and he later worked as the managing editor of the Daily Record, both in Little Rock. He later moved to Atlanta, where he worked as a reporter at The Atlanta Journal-Constitution. In 1995, he began working for The Wall Street Journal and in 2012 became its Atlanta bureau chief. While there, he shared the 2011 Gerald Loeb Award for Large Newspapers for the story "Deep Trouble".

In 2008, Blackmon published Slavery by Another Name: The Re-Enslavement of Black Americans from the Civil War to World War II, which explored the history of peonage and convict lease labor in the South after the American Civil War. He revealed the stories of tens of thousands of slaves and their descendants who journeyed into freedom after Abraham Lincoln issued the Emancipation Proclamation and then journeyed back into the shadow of involuntary servitude, which lasted into the 20th century. In 2009, Blackmon was awarded the Pulitzer Prize for General Non-Fiction for Slavery by Another Name.

A documentary film which is based on Blackmon's book and also titled Slavery by Another Name, was aired on February 13, 2012, on PBS stations. The film can be viewed in its entirety on the PBS website.

From 2012 until 2018 Blackmon was the host and executive producer of American Forum, a weekly public-affairs program that was broadcast on more than 100 PBS stations in the United States. It was produced in conjunction with the University of Virginia's Miller Center of Public Affairs, where Blackmon was a senior fellow and the Director of Public Programs.

References

American newspaper journalists
1964 births
Living people
Pulitzer Prize for General Non-Fiction winners
The Wall Street Journal people
Hendrix College alumni
People from Stuttgart, Arkansas
People from Leland, Mississippi
Writers from Arkansas
Writers from Mississippi
American male journalists
20th-century American male writers
21st-century American male writers
20th-century American journalists
21st-century American journalists
21st-century American non-fiction writers
American Book Award winners
Gerald Loeb Award winners for Large Newspapers